Senna scandens is a species of flowering plant in the legume family, Fabaceae. It is endemic to Ecuador. There are five known populations. It grows in wet forest habitat in the western Andes.

References

scandens
Endemic flora of Ecuador
Endangered plants
Taxonomy articles created by Polbot
Plants described in 1832